West Brighton station may refer to:

 A former name for Hove railway station, Sussex, England 
 A common name for West New Brighton station, a former station in New York City